Keuning is a surname. Notable people with the surname include:

Dave Keuning (born 1976), American guitarist
Maartje Keuning (born 1998), Dutch water polo player
Ralph Keuning (born 1961), Dutch art historian
Wytze Keuning (1876–1957), Dutch school teacher, author, and classical music critic